Vesna Tominac Matačić (born 25 October 1968) is a Croatian actress.

Filmography

Television roles

Movie roles

References

External links

1968 births
Living people
Croatian actresses
Croatian stage actresses
Croatian television actresses
Croatian film actresses
People from Vinkovci